Filipe Lombá (born 14 November 1959) is a Portuguese sprinter. He competed in the men's 400 metres at the 1988 Summer Olympics.

References

1959 births
Living people
Athletes (track and field) at the 1988 Summer Olympics
Portuguese male sprinters
Olympic athletes of Portugal

Portuguese people of São Tomé and Príncipe descent